Buck Mountain is a mountain located in the Teton Range, Grand Teton National Park, Wyoming, immediately southeast of Grand Teton.

Description
The mountain is the highest summit south of Garnet Canyon and is easily seen from most vantage points in Jackson Hole. Views from the summit offer excellent views of the Cathedral Group to the north. The west slopes of the summit tower are along the Alaska Basin Trail and extend into Caribou-Targhee National Forest and the Jedediah Smith Wilderness, which is the location of Alaska Basin, a popular wilderness camping area for backpackers. Timberline Lake is located on the eastern flanks of the peak.

History

The first documented summiting by people of European descent was on August 21, 1898, by T.M. Bannon and George Buck, only ten days after Grand Teton was first climbed by another party. Bannon later became the first person to climb Borah Peak, the tallest mountain in the state of Idaho.

References

Mountains of Grand Teton National Park
Mountains of Wyoming
Mountains of Teton County, Wyoming